Platypezina diversa is a species of fly in the genus Platypezina.

References

Platypezidae
Insects described in 1923
Taxa named by Charles Willison Johnson